The spot-breasted lapwing (Vanellus melanocephalus) is a species of bird in the family Charadriidae. It is endemic to the Ethiopian highlands.

A chunky lapwing of the Ethiopian highlands. Note the black cap, white eyebrow, black throat, and coarse spots across the breast. Found in both wet and dry montane habitats, including grassland, moorland, and marsh

References

spot-breasted lapwing
Endemic birds of Ethiopia
Birds of the Horn of Africa
Fauna of the Ethiopian Highlands
spot-breasted lapwing
Taxonomy articles created by Polbot
Taxa named by Eduard Rüppell